The 1920 United States Senate election in Colorado took place on November 2, 1920. Incumbent Democratic Senator Charles S. Thomas initially declined to run for re-election, and State Supreme Court Justice Tully Scott won the Democratic nomination to succeed him, facing off against former Leadville Mayor Samuel D. Nicholson, the Republican nominee. However, in October 1920, Thomas announced that he would run for re-election as the nominee of the National Party. However, Thomas's decision did not ultimately affect the outcome of the election. Aided by Republican presidential nominee Warren G. Harding's strong performance in the state, as well as Republican Governor Oliver Henry Shoup's landslide re-election, Nicholson defeated Tully and Thomas in a landslide. Out of four candidates, Thomas placed fourth, winning just 3% of the vote and finishing behind Farmer–Labor nominee G. F. Stevens.

Nicholson did not end up serving for the entire six-year term for which he was elected; he died in office on March 24, 1923, triggering a special election in 1924.

Democratic primary

Candidates
 Tully Scott, Colorado Supreme Court Justice
 W. R. Callicotte, Chairman of the Colorado Farmers' Union
 William C. Danks, former Littleton City Councilman

Results

Republican primary

Candidates
 Samuel D. Nicholson, former Mayor of Leadville, 1914 and 1916 Republican candidate for Governor
 Karl C. Schuyler, attorney
 Rice W. Means, former Adams County Judge

Results

General election

Results

References

1920
Colorado
United States Senate